The Next Step Beyond is a 1978 revival of the 1950s–1960s American television series One Step Beyond, hosted by original host John Newland. Like One Step Beyond, the series purported to tell true stories of the supernatural. Unlike the original, this series had a short run of one season of 25 episodes, 14 of which were remakes.

Background
Inspired by the syndication success of the original series as well as The Twilight Zone, Star Trek and especially Space: 1999, John Newland and Collier Young who participated in the original series, and Alan J. Factor decided to produce a new version of One Step Beyond to be titled The Next Step Beyond, for syndication. Original series creator Merwin Gerard came back as story editor. Newland returned as series host, sporting white hair and large eyeglasses, otherwise looking the same.

Worldvision Enterprises, distributor of the original series, distributed the new series as well. Without the benefit of a sponsor like Alcoa, the series only had a budget of $92,000 an episode.

There were several drawbacks. The series was shot on videotape, and lacked the noirish look of the original.

Several episodes of the original series were remade. All of the remakes were based on Merwin Gerard originals. The budget limit also limited the series' ability to present stories in other times, because of the lack of period costumes and settings, which had been lavish in One Step Beyond. The budget also meant the series could not afford any big name guest stars. The series was canceled after 25 episodes were produced. After running a few cycles on television, the series disappeared and has not been seen since.

Episodes

References

External links

1970s American anthology television series
1978 American television series debuts
1979 American television series endings
American fantasy television series
American horror fiction television series
English-language television shows
First-run syndicated television programs in the United States
Television series by CBS Studios